The 1915 Creighton Bluejays football team was an American football team that represented Creighton University as an independent during the 1915 college football season. The Bluejays compiled a 3–3–1 record and outscored their opponents 138 to 72.

Schedule

References

Creighton
Creighton Bluejays football seasons
Creighton Blue and White football